Isabelle Poulenard (born 5 July 1961) is  French contemporary soprano.

Poulenard was born in Paris.  Her work has generally been focused on music of the French Baroque, however, she has performed and recorded George Frideric Handel and Georg Philipp Telemann. Her voice has been compared to that of Emma Kirkby.

External links

official website

1961 births
Living people
Singers from Paris
French operatic sopranos
20th-century French women opera singers